Articles (arranged alphabetically) related to Namibia include:



1 
 1980 in Namibia

A 
Ananias Shikongo
Angola

B 
Basters
Beata Naigambo
Bethanien
Bush Encroachment

C 
 Caprivi Strip
 Communications in Namibia
 Constituencies of Namibia

D 
Dorsland Trek

E 
 Economy of Namibia
 Epupa Falls
 Erongo Region
 Etosha National Park

F 
 Frankie Fredericks
 Fransfontein

G 
 Geography of Namibia
German colonisation
 German South-West Africa
 Gobabis
 Grootfontein
 Grünau
Günther von Hundelshausen

H 
 Hardap Region
 Hentiesbay
Hereroland
Herero and Namaqua Genocide
Hilaria Johannes
History of Namibia

I 
 Independence Avenue (Windhoek)

J 

Jeremiah Baisako
Johannes Nambala
Jurie van Tonder

K 
 ǁKaras Region
 Karibib
 Kamanjab
 Karasburg
 Katima Mulilo
 Katutura
Khoisan people
 Keetmanshoop
 Khomas Region
 Khomasdal
 Khorixas
 Kombat
Kuaima Riruako
 Kunene Region

L 
 LGBT rights in Namibia (Gay rights)
 List of cities in Namibia
 List of Namibians
 List of national parks of Namibia
 Lüderitz
 Luhonono

M 
 Maltahöhe
 Military of Namibia
 Music of Namibia
 Mutau

N 
 Namibia
 Namibia national rugby union team
Namibia Statistics Agency
 Namibia Breweries Limited
 Namibian cricket team
 Naute Dam

O 
Ogongo
Ogongo Constituency
Okahandja
 Ohangwena Region
 Okavango Region
Okongo
Okongo Constituency
 Okonjima
 Omaheke
 Omaruru
 Omusati
 Ondangwa
Ongwediva
 Opuwo
Orange River
 Oranjemund
 Oshakati
 Oshana
 Oshikango
 Oshivelo
 Oshikoto Region
 Otavi
 Otjiwarongo
 Otjozondjupa
 Outjo

P 
Paulus Ambunda
Politics of Namibia
 Postal orders of Namibia

Q

R 
 Regions of Namibia
 Rehoboth
Riaan Walters
 Ruacana
 Rugby union in Namibia
 Rundu

S 
 Sandwich Harbour
 Scouts of Namibia
Sherwin Vries
Seeheim
 Sesfontein
 Sesriem
 Sossusvlei
 Solitaire
 South Africa
 South African Border War
South West Africa Campaign
South West African Territorial Force
 Special Field Force
 Swakopmund
SWAPO

T 
 Telecom Namibia
Thimoteus Tjamuaha
Tjama Tjivikua
 Transport in Namibia
 Tsumeb
 Twyfelfontein

U 
 Uis
 United States Ambassador to Namibia
 University of Namibia
 Usakos
 Uutapi

V 
 Vyf Rand
 Von Bach Dam

W 
 Walvis Bay
 Water supply and sanitation in Namibia
 Wildlife of Namibia
 Windhoek

X

Y

Z 
Zoo Park in Windhoek
Zambezi Region

See also

Lists of country-related topics - similar lists for other countries

 
Namibia